"Take It All" is a song written by Maury Yeston for the 2009 musical film Nine, a film adaptation of the musical Nine. The song is performed by Luisa Contini (Marion Cotillard). It was nominated for an Academy Award for Best Original Song at the 82nd Academy Awards. The official music video for the song has over 2 million views on YouTube.

Production
The song was "one of the new songs written expressly for the film".

Composer Maury Yeston gave some insight into the song's production:

Critical reception
ReelViews wrote "The film's most powerful song, "Take It All," is delivered by Marion Cotillard with a level of passion and intensity that surpasses any non-singing moment". The site also suggestion that the desire to retain a PG-13 rating "restrained Marshall from taking a few of the numbers a little further (in particular, "Take It All" and "Be Italian")".

Accolades

References

2009 songs
Compositions by Maury Yeston
Songs written for films